Roger François Lotte (b. 1922 - d. 1989) was French archetier and bow maker, son of François Lotte and Marguerite Ouchard. 

Roger studied the art of bow making with his father and took over his shop around 1960. He made bows for: George Deblaye, Dupuy, Léon Mougenot, Étienne Vatelot, Roger & Max Millant and Bernard Millant amongst others. His best bows made entirely by himself are stamped: Roger François Lotte and sometimes Roger Lotte.
"Some of the bows from 1965-1970 mounted in gold/tortoise-shell are stunning".

References 

 
 
 
 Dictionnaire universel del luthiers - René Vannes 1951, 1972, 1985 (vol.3)
 Universal Dictionary of Violin & Bow Makers - William Henley 1970

Bow makers
Luthiers from Mirecourt
1922 births
1989 deaths